Hong Kong competed at the 2020 Summer Paralympics in Tokyo, Japan, from 24 August to 5 September 2021.

Medalists

Competitors
The following is the list of number of competitors participating in the Games:

Archery 

Hong Kong has entered one archer at Men's Individual Compound Open.

|-
|align=left| Ngai Ka Chuen
|align=left rowspan=1|Men's individual compound
|667
|30
|align="center" |W 140-138
|align="center" |L 131-144
|align="center" colspan=4|Did not advance
|}

Athletics 

Two Hong Kong athletes has successfully entered the paralympic slot in athletics.

Track events
Women

Field events
Men

Badminton 

Hong Kong has qualified a total of two para-badminton players for each of the following events into the Paralympic tournament based on the Para Badminton World Rankings.

Men

Boccia 

Six Hong Kong athletes get a ticket in Individual BC3, BC4 & Individual BC2 events.

Individual

Pairs

Equestrian 

Hong Kong sent two athlete after qualified.

Individual

Swimming 

Four Hong Kong swimmer has successfully entered the paralympic slot after breaking the MQS.
Men's events

Women's events

Table tennis

Hong Kong entered two athletes into the table tennis competition at the games. Ng Mui Wui qualified from 2019 ITTF Asian Para Championships which was held in Taichung, Taiwan and Wong Ting Ting qualified via World Ranking allocation.

Women

Wheelchair fencing 

Women

See also
Hong Kong at the Paralympics
Hong Kong at the 2020 Summer Olympics

References 

Nations at the 2020 Summer Paralympics
2020
2021 in Hong Kong sport